Todd Babiak is a Canadian writer and entrepreneur living in Tasmania.

Career

He is CEO of Brand Tasmania, a co-founder of Story Engine and Places are People, and has published several bestselling novels. His first novel, Choke Hold, was a finalist for the Rogers Writers' Trust Fiction Prize and a winner of the Henry Kreisel Award, and his second novel, The Garneau Block, was a longlisted nominee for the Scotiabank Giller Prize, won the City of Edmonton Book Prize and was shortlisted for the Alberta Book Award for best novel. The Garneau Block was later adapted for the stage by Canadian actress and playwright Belinda Cornish, premiering in September 2021 at the Citadel Theatre, in Edmonton. The Book of Stanley is in development as a television series. His screenplay The Great One, co-authored with Jason Margolis, won a Praxis Screenwriting Fellowship.

His fourth novel, Toby: A Man, was published by HarperCollins in January 2010. It was shortlisted for the Stephen Leacock Memorial Medal for Humour and won the Georges Bugnet Award for best work of fiction by an Alberta author. He was, for 10 years, a columnist at the Edmonton Journal.

Come Barbarians, his fifth novel, a literary thriller set in France, was published in late 2013 by HarperCollins. It was chosen as a 2013 Globe and Mail best book. Its sequel, Son of France: A Christopher Kruse Novel was published in 2016 by HarperCollins.

Babiak's latest novel, The Empress of Idaho, was published by McClelland and Stewart in 2019.

In October of 2021, McClelland and Stewart will publish Babiak's next book, The Spirit's Up, a Christmas novel, in Canada and the United States.

Works

 Choke Hold (2000)
 The Garneau Block (2006)
 The Book of Stanley (2007)
 Toby: A Man (2010)
 Come Barbarians (2013)
 Son of France: A Christopher Kruse Novel (2016)
 The Empress of Idaho (2019)

References

External links
 Todd Babiak

Canadian male novelists
Canadian humour columnists
Living people
Writers from Edmonton
21st-century Canadian novelists
21st-century Canadian male writers
Canadian male non-fiction writers
Year of birth missing (living people)